Acisoma inflatum, the stout pintail is a species of dragonfly in the family Libellulidae.

Distribution
Throughout much of Africa; relict populations exist north of the Sahara in Algeria, Egypt and Libya.

Habitat
It is found near and in calm water bodies with grass, such as grassy ponds and pans.

Gallery

Identification 
Distribution overlaps with the similar Acisoma variegatum (slender pintail) in southern and eastern Africa. The two species can be differentiated based on abdominal markings and abdomen shape.

References

External links 

 Acisoma inflatum on African Dragonflies and Damselflies Online
 Acisoma inflatum on A Visual Guide to the Damselflies and Dragonflies of South Africa
 Acisoma inflatum on Dragonflies & Damselflies of southern Africa

Libellulidae
Insects described in 1882